Roundtop Hill is a mountain in Washington County, Maryland, southwest of the town of Hancock.

Geography
Its presence causes a large bend in the Potomac River, which curves around its eastern slope. Much of the eastern face is part of the Chesapeake and Ohio Canal National Historical Park and the canal bed and tow path pass along the narrow bank at its base.

Geology

Outstanding outcrops of the Silurian Wills Creek Formation and underlying Bloomsburg Formation are exposed along the old railroad grade at Roundtop Hill. Examples of folding, formation of cleavage, thrust faulting, and the deformation of bedded rocks are visible.  About 500 feet of strata are exposed.

References

Mountains of Maryland
Landforms of Washington County, Maryland
Allegheny Mountains